This is a list of television specials which first aired on Australian television in 2008. The list is arranged in chronological order. Where more than one programming changed was made on the same date, those changes are listed alphabetically.

List

See also
 Lists of television specials

Notes

References

2008 in Australian television
Specials
Lists of television specials